Pietro Pedroni or Petroni (born 1744, died 1803) was an Italian painter of the Neoclassic period.

Biography
Pietro Pedroni was born in Pontremoli, and was artistically trained in Parma and Rome. He was taught under Angelo Banchero. In 1785 he was named court painter in Florence, and became rector of the Royal Academy of Fine Arts in that city. He was assisted by Giuseppe Piattoli.

Subsequent generations had a poor impression of the man: Saltini in his History of Fine Arts of Tuscany said of him:
He was mediocre painter; and he obtained his position by some cabal, and after being placed in the direction of teaching of Florentine painting in the Academy, he did great damage to art. Little had he drawn, and less painted less before his appointment; he did nothing afterward, and completely abandoned the brushes. He always spoke to young pupils, but never once said, here's how it works. Woe to art teachers who argue and write, used to say Canova, it is a sign that they dare not and can not do (art).

Others are less biting, for example, Francesco Inghirami said that:
He settled in Florence but worked little and reluctantly due to his poor health he had. If the right audience does not find in him an exceptional painter, he was an amazing teacher, erudite in theories, highly eloquent, and most loving in teaching his students.

Among his pupils at the Academy were Pietro Benvenuti, who would replace him as director of the Academy, and Pietro Ermini.

References

Year of birth unknown
1803 deaths
18th-century Italian painters
Italian male painters
Painters from Florence
Academic staff of the Accademia di Belle Arti di Firenze
1744 births
18th-century Italian male artists